Jürgen Hartmann (born 28 August 1970) is a retired Austrian football defender.

References

1970 births
Living people
Austrian footballers
FC Tirol Innsbruck players
Grazer AK players
Association football defenders
Austrian Football Bundesliga players
Austria international footballers
People from Leoben
Footballers from Styria